September Storm is a 1960 American adventure film directed by Byron Haskin and starring Joanne Dru and Mark Stevens.

Filmed in 3-D and DeLuxe Color and presented in CinemaScope, it is notable as the only U.S. feature film made in 3-D between Revenge of the Creature, which was released in the spring of 1955 and marked the end of the 1950s 3-D movie fad in the U.S., and The Bubble, which premiered in late 1966 and introduced the economical "over-and-under" single-strip format used by most of the 3-D films of the 1970s through early-2000s.

Plot
American fashion model Anne Traymore, swimming off the isle of Majorca, loses a bracelet, which the handsome Manuel del Rio Montoya returns to her. She believes he owns a beautiful yacht called The Swan, but he merely works on it for the wealthy Rene LeClerc.

A couple of fortune hunters, Balfour and Williams, claim they know where $3 million in gold doubloons can be found, but need a boat. They offer a share to Anne and Manuel, and the latter deceives LeClerc by claiming the boat needs three weeks of repairs.

A raging storm causes the propeller to be clogged by seaweed. Balfour dives to clear it and is stung by a man-o-war. He is taken to an island to recover. Manuel professes his love for Anne, who rejects him, Balfour having caught her eye instead. An angry Manuel tries to leave and gets into a fight with Williams that nearly sinks the vessel.

After the divers bring up the loot, Williams decides to strand the others and keep it all to himself. By now, LeClerc has become aware of the deception and intercepts them, but he is talked out of contacting the law by being offered a share of the money. The Coast Guard, alas, arrives to confiscate it all.

Cast
Joanne Dru as Anne Traymore
Mark Stevens as Joe Balfour
Robert Strauss as Ernie Williams
Asher Dann as Manuel del Rio Montoya
Jean-Pierre Kérien as LeClerc

Production
Like the feature-length 3-D films of the 1950s when they were originally released, it was projected by the polarized light method and viewed through gray Polaroid filters in viewers which, according to the film's poster, were "scientifically designed by master craftsmen!" Most theaters, however, presented it "flat", in 2-D.

Although it is widely believed to have been filmed in Stereovision, Bob Furmanek, who oversaw the 2016 restoration, says this is a myth. It was shot full-frame with the original NaturalVision cameras used on Bwana Devil. The center of the image was then extracted to create a 2.35:1 aspect ratio, in the manner of the then-current Superscope process. Unfortunately, it was poorly done, resulting in a large number of badly-framed shots; for example, the scene with the Flamenco dancers has a huge amount of headroom while their feet are cut off.

Reception
Both September Storm and 3-D in general were roundly dismissed by influential critic Bosley Crowther in his New York Times review.

Restoration and re-release
As of August 2, 2016, "a 3-D Restoration has been slated slated to begin. The 3-D Film Archive has already obtained, for a limited time, the rights to restore and distribute SEPTEMBER STORM, but the hard work is still ahead of us. Both the left eye and right eye film elements will need to be digitally scanned, frame by frame. We will need to assess the level of damage to these existing elements, and determine how to best fix the images. This will require a stereoscopic re-alignment pass, left and right color restoration and matching, and clean-up of scratches and other damages to the film surface. This is very challenging post-production work, and can potentially be very expensive. Fortunately, the 3-D Film Archive already has a great track record from its previous restoration projects, and by teaming up with 3-D SPACE and maintaining this work "in house" costs will be kept at a manageable level. We are confident that we will be able to produce both a 3-D blu-ray master and a digital cinema package (DCP) that will look fantastic."

See also
List of 3D films

References

External links
 
 
 
 
 
 September Storm at the 3-D Film Archive

1960 films
1960s 3D films
1960 adventure films
20th Century Fox films
American adventure films
Films directed by Byron Haskin
Films set in the Mediterranean Sea
Films shot in Mallorca
Seafaring films
Treasure hunt films
Underwater action films
Films scored by Raoul Kraushaar
1960s English-language films
1960s American films